The Mountains of Kong are a legendary mountain range charted on maps of Africa from 1798 through to the late 1880s. The mountains were once thought to begin in West Africa near the highland source of the Niger River close to Tembakounda in Guinea, then continue east to the equally legendary Central African Mountains of the Moon, thought to be where the White Nile had its source. None of these mountains actually exist.

History 
In 1798 a map resulting from the explorations of the area by Mungo Park showed this west to east mountain range for the first time. It was produced by the English cartographer James Rennell, who showed the Niger evaporating inland at Wangara.

The German map maker Johann Reinecke included the mountains in his map of 1804 as the Gebirge Kong. In 1805 the London engraver John Cary showed them for the first time linking to the Mountains of the Moon.

Various nineteenth century explorers of West Africa included the range on maps they produced or directed the production of after exploring the area. These include French explorer René Caillié, who explored the highlands of Guinea at Fouta Djallon, near the source of the Niger; the Cornish explorer Richard Lemon Lander and his younger brother John; and Scottish explorer Hugh Clapperton who also sought the course of the Niger River in its upper reaches.
The historians Thomas Basset and Phillip Porter have identified forty maps showing the mountains published between 1798 and 1892.
 
Despite the failure of other later explorers to locate the range, it continued to appear on maps until late in the nineteenth century.

Cartographers stopped including the mountains on maps after French explorer Louis Gustave Binger established that the mountains were fictitious in his 1887–89 expedition to chart the Niger River from its mouth in the Gulf of Guinea and through Côte d'Ivoire.

In 1928 Bartholemew's Oxford Advanced Atlas still contained them in its index locating them at 8° 40' N, 5° 0' W. Even later they appeared erroneously in Goode's World Atlas of 1995.

Related namings
The town of Kong, Ivory Coast dates to the 12th century and bears the name which it gave to the mountains. This rose in power during the 17th century to form the Kong Empire which eventually passed under French colonial rule.

Gallery of maps

References

History of Africa
Kong
Kong